Gabriella Elizabeth Cuevas Reyes (born 15 August 1993) is an American-born Dominican footballer who plays as a centre back for Finnish Kansallinen Liiga club Kuopion Palloseura and the Dominican Republic women's national team.

Early life
Cuevas was raised in Wayne, New Jersey to a Colombian father and a Dominican mother.

High school and college career
Cuevas has attended the Immaculate Heart Academy in Washington Township, Bergen County, New Jersey; the University of Connecticut in Storrs, Connecticut and the Monmouth University in West Long Branch, New Jersey.

Club career
Cuevas has played for FC Kiryat Gat and FC Ramat HaSharon in Israel and for KuPS in Finland.

International career
Cuevas made her senior debut for the Dominican Republic on 22 October 2021, starting in a 3–0 friendly home win over Bolivia.

International goals
Scores and results list Dominican Republic goal tally first

References

External links

1993 births
Living people
Citizens of the Dominican Republic through descent
Dominican Republic women's footballers
Women's association football central defenders
F.C. Kiryat Gat (women) players
F.C. Ramat HaSharon players
Immaculate Heart Academy alumni
Kuopion Palloseura players
Kansallinen Liiga players
Dominican Republic women's international footballers
Dominican Republic expatriate women's footballers
Dominican Republic expatriate sportspeople in Israel
Expatriate women's footballers in Israel
Dominican Republic expatriate sportspeople in Finland
Expatriate women's footballers in Finland
Dominican Republic people of Colombian descent
People from Wayne, New Jersey
Sportspeople from Passaic County, New Jersey
Soccer players from New Jersey
American women's soccer players
UConn Huskies women's soccer players
Monmouth Hawks women's soccer players
NJ/NY Gotham FC players
American expatriate women's soccer players
American expatriate sportspeople in Israel
American expatriate sportspeople in Finland
American sportspeople of Colombian descent
American sportspeople of Dominican Republic descent